S.D Dental College Parbhani  or SD MESOC Foundation's Saraswati Dhanwantari Dental College is a dental college in Parbhani, Maharashtra, India, affiliated to Maharashtra University of Health Sciences (M.U.H.S., Nashik).

History
The following are the major milestones in the institute's history.
 2007 Establishment of SD dental college a hospital Parbhani
 2009 Establishment of Dr.Prafulla Patil Nursing School, Parbhani
 2013 Post graduate MDS
 2015 Dr.Praffula Patil Medical College established
 2017 accredited by NAAC

Admission
Admission to the institute was through the MHT-CET. Currently, admission is via Asso-CET, the entrance exam conducted by the Association of Private Unaided Medical and Dental Colleges. The exam is held each year in April–June.

References

External links
 Saraswati Dhanwantari Dental College

1990 establishments in Maharashtra
Educational institutions established in 1990
Universities and colleges in Maharashtra
Dental colleges in India
Parbhani
Affiliates of Maharashtra University of Health Sciences